The Blackmail Starters Kit is the second EP by Spahn Ranch, released on April 1, 1994 by Cleopatra Records. It contain remixes from the band's 1993 debut studio album Collateral Damage.

Reception
Jon Worley of Aiding & Abetting commended The Blackmail Starters Kit EP for being a stylistic departure from the band's debut studio album and said "mixing elements of heavy industrial, goth and just plain meanness, Spahn Ranch creates a picture of the world that is sparse and unyielding." Option compared the band favorably to Ministry and Nine Inch Nails and claimed "the beats aren't altogether mechanical, the guitar grind is often captivating, and the vocals are appropriately buried in electronic dirt."

Track listing

Personnel
Adapted from The Blackmail Starters Kit liner notes.

Spahn Ranch
 Matt Green – sampler, keyboards, production (1-4, 6, 7), remix (2)
 Athan Maroulis – lead vocals
 Rob Morton – programming, sampler, production, recording (5)

Production and design
 Thomas Eakins – painting
 Judson Leach – recording (1-4, 6, 7), remix (3, 4)
 Christopher Payne – cover art, illustrations, design

Release history

References

External links 
 The Blackmail Starters Kit at iTunes
 

1994 EPs
Remix EPs
Spahn Ranch (band) albums
Cleopatra Records EPs